Miss Universe Canada 2008 was held on April 28, 2008 in Toronto, Ontario, Canada. Inga Skaya crowned her successor, Samantha Tajik, with 70 women competing in the pageant.

Results

Special awards
 Miss Congeniality - Pauline Ranjbar (North Quebec)
 Miss Photogenic - Cynthia O'Poole (New Brunswick Province)

Order of announcement

Top 5 

 Langley
 North Ontario
 Lower Alberta
 Scarborough
 British Columbia Province
 Upper Canada

Top 10 

 Langley
 North Ontario
 Upper Canada
 Southeast Ontario
 British Columbia Province
 Southeast Canada
 Scarborough
 Ontario Province
 Lower Alberta
 National Capital Region

Top 20 

 Burnaby
 West Ontario
 National Capital Region
 Quebec Province
 British Columbia Province
 Montreal
 Toronto
 Southeast Canada
 Upper Canada
 West Coast
 Burrard Peninsula
 Langley
 Southwest Ontario
 Lower Alberta
 North Ontario
 Southeast Ontario
 North Vancouver
 East Quebec
 Scarborough
 Ontario Province

Contestants

Notes
 Lateesha Ector competed at Miss Earth 2009, she was unplaced.
 Sahar Biniaz competed at Miss Tourism Queen International 2008, she was the 2nd Runner-up.
 Elena Semikina represented Canada in Miss International 2008, she was unplaced.

External links
 Miss Universe Canada Official Website

References

2008 in Toronto
Miss Universe Canada
2008 beauty pageants
Events in Toronto